Rhoemetalces may refer to:

Monarchs
 Rhoemetalces I, king of Thrace from 12 BC to 12
 Rhoemetalces II, king of Thrace from 18 to 38
 Rhoemetalces III, king of Thrace from 38 to 46
 Tiberius Julius Rhoemetalces (flourished 2nd century), Roman client king of the Bosporan Kingdom

Other
 Remetalk Point on Livingston Island in the South Shetland Islands, named for Rhoemetalces III

See also
 Odrysian kingdom